The Bakersfield College Renegades (referred to as BC Renegades or Gades) represent Bakersfield College in 20 sports. The college competes in the Western State Conference, which is affiliated with the California Community College Athletic Association.

Varsity sports
Bakersfield College competes in 20 varsity sports teams; 10 men's and 10 women's:

Men's sports
Baseball
Basketball
Cross Country
Football
Golf
Soccer
Swimming
Tennis
Track & Field
Wrestling

Women's sports
Basketball
Beach Volleyball
Cross Country
Golf
Soccer
Softball
Volleyball
Swimming
Tennis
Track & Field

Football
The following is the record for BC football. It is effective as of 2015.

National Championships: 1953, 1959, 1976, 1988, 2012
Potato Bowl: 1952, 1955, 1957, 1958, 1960, 1963, 1965, 1976, 1979, 1981, 1987, 1988, 1989, 1990,  1992, 1993, 1994,1995, 1996, 1997, 1998, 1999, 2000, 2001
Southern California Championship:1998, 2001, 2007, 2012
California State Championship: 2007, 2012
Play-Off Bowls: 1967, 1969, 1970, 1998, 2001, 2005, 2007, 2009, 2012
Conference Champions: Over 20 Times

References

External links
GoGades.com

 
Sports in Bakersfield, California